There were thirty-six independent and non-affiliated candidates in the 1985 Quebec provincial election, none of whom were elected. Information about these candidates may be found on this page.

Electoral divisions

Mercier: Gilles Côté
Gilles Côté was forty-seven years old in 1985 and identified as a taxi driver. A member of the Social Credit Party of Canada, he ran for public office several times in the 1980s at the federal, provincial, and municipal levels.

A candidate named Gilles Côté ran for the Ralliement national party in the 1966 provincial election. It is assumed this was the same person.

Richelieu: Michel Guilbault
Michel Guilbault received 347 votes (1.13%), finishing fourth against Quebec Liberal Party candidate Albert Khelfa.

References

1985